The 1992 New York Yankees season was the 90th season for the Yankees, their 69th at Yankee Stadium and their first under manager Buck Showalter. The team looked to improve their standings from 1991 when they finished fifth in the American League Eastern Division with a 71-91 record.

The Yankees did improve their record by five games and finished tied for fourth place with the Cleveland Indians at 76-86, twenty games behind the eventual world champion Toronto Blue Jays. Nevertheless, the team finished with a losing record for the fourth consecutive year, with 86 being their fewest losses in that span. As of 2022, this is the last time that the Yankees finished with a losing record.

Offseason
November 13, 1991: Ramiro Mendoza was signed as an amateur free agent by the Yankees.
November 20, 1991: Eric Plunk was released by the New York Yankees.
December 2, 1991: Bob Geren was selected off waivers from the Yankees by the Cincinnati Reds.
January 6, 1992: Danny Tartabull was signed as a free agent with the Yankees.
January 8, 1992: Darrin Chapin was traded by the Yankees to the Philadelphia Phillies for a player to be named later. The Phillies completed the deal by sending Charlie Hayes to the Yankees on February 19.
January 9, 1992: Mike Gallego signed as a free agent with the Yankees.
 January 10, 1992: Steve Sax was traded by the Yankees to the Chicago White Sox for Bob Wickman, Domingo Jean and Mélido Pérez.

Regular season
On August 12, pitcher Scott Sanderson threw exactly three pitches and recorded three outs. This was accomplished in the fifth inning.
J. T. Snow made his major league debut on September 20 against the Kansas City Royals. In five at bats he had no hits.

Season standings

Record vs. opponents

Notable transactions
April 9, 1992: Shawn Hillegas was signed as a free agent by the Yankees.
June 1, 1992: Derek Jeter was drafted by the New York Yankees in the 1st round (6th pick) of the 1992 amateur draft. Player signed June 27, 1992.
August 22, 1992: Tim Leary and cash were traded by the Yankees to the Seattle Mariners for Sean Twitty (minors).
August 22, 1992: Shawn Hillegas was released by the New York Yankees.

Roster

Player stats

Batting

Starters by position
Note: Pos = Position; G = Games played; AB = At bats; H = Hits; Avg. = Batting average; HR = Home runs; RBI = Runs batted in

Other batters
Note: G = Games played; AB = At bats; H = Hits; Avg. = Batting average; HR = Home runs; RBI = Runs batted in

Pitching

Starting pitchers
Note: G = Games pitched; IP = Innings pitched; W = Wins; L = Losses; ERA = Earned run average; SO = Strikeouts; BB = Walks allowed

Other pitchers
Note: G = Games pitched; IP = Innings pitched; W = Wins; L = Losses; ERA = Earned run average; SO = Strikeouts; BB = Walks allowed

Relief pitchers
Note: G = Games pitched; IP = Innings pitched; W = Wins; L = Losses; SV = Saves; ERA = Earned run average; SO = Strikeouts; BB = Walks allowed

Farm system

LEAGUE CHAMPIONS: Columbus

References

External links
1992 New York Yankees at Baseball Reference
1992 New York Yankees team page at www.baseball-almanac.com

New York Yankees seasons
New York Yankees
New York Yankees
1990s in the Bronx